Robbie Bourdon is a freeride mountain biker from Nelson, British Columbia, Canada. He is sponsored by Intense Cycles, Red Bull and Oakley.

Career
A former member of the Kona Clump Team, he has appeared in all the New World Disorder videos.  In 2001, Bourdon placed 5th in the All Terrain Mountain Bike Challenge in Jindabyne, Australia and 3rd in the Red Bull Rampage in Virgin, Utah.

References

Canadian male cyclists
Living people
Freeride mountain bikers
People from Nelson, British Columbia
Canadian mountain bikers
Year of birth missing (living people)